David Parsons may refer to:

 David Parsons (bishop) (21st century), bishop of the Arctic
 David Parsons (cricket coach) (born 1967), English cricket coach
 David Parsons (cricketer, born 1954), former English cricketer
 David Parsons (racing driver) (born 1959), racing driver from Tasmania, Australia
 Dave Parsons (born 1965), British bass guitarist
 David Parsons, founder of Parsons Dance Company
 David "Truckie" Parsons (born 1955), racing driver from Victoria, Australia
 David Parsons (composer), New Age and relaxation music composer
 David Parsons (organist) (1935–2019), Australian organist